Northern Ohio Traction and Light was an American company. It operated electric interurban rail lines in Ohio. It also provided power for streetlights to Dover, Ohio and Akron, Ohio. It purchased train cars from G. C. Kuhlman Car Co.

History
The Akron, Bedford & Cleveland Railroad merged with several other area railroads to form the Northern Ohio Traction & Light Company around 1900. It operated several rail lines and served Cleveland, Canton, Akron, Massillon, Uhrichsville, Wadsworth, East Greenville, Kent, Ravenna, Alliance and Warren. The Ohio Supreme Court adjudicated on a suit by a county to terminate the company's franchise in a dispute over passenger fees.

In 1926 the operation was renamed the Northern Ohio Power & Light Company .  It consolidated with Ohio Edison around 1930 and its rail lines were discontinued by 1932.

Further reading
The Northern Ohio Traction and Light (NOT&L) Story, Central Electric Railfans Association (January 1, 1966)

References

Electric railways in Ohio
1932 disestablishments in Ohio